Carrandi is a district of the Matina canton, in the Limón province of Costa Rica.

History 
Carrandi was created on 26 November 1971 by Decreto Ejecutivo 2078-G.

Geography 
Carrandi has an area of  km² and an elevation of  metres.

Locations
Villages (Poblados): Barra de Matina Sur, Boca del Pantano, Boca Río Matina, Boston, California, Indio, Larga Distancia, Luisa Este, Maravilla, Milla 14, Nueva York, Palacios, Peje, Punta de Riel, Río Cuba, Saborío, San Edmundo, San José, Sterling, Strafford, Toro, Trinidad, Venecia, Zent

Demographics 

For the 2011 census, Carrandi had a population of  inhabitants.

Transportation

Road transportation 
The district is covered by the following road routes:
 National Route 32
 National Route 803
 National Route 807

References 

Districts of Limón Province
Populated places in Limón Province